The Ligai Olii Tojikiston (Tajik: Лигаи Олии Тоҷикистон) or Tajikistan Higher League (Russian: Высшая лига Таджикистана) is the top division of professional football in Tajikistan. It is part of the Tajikistan Football League Organization and Tajikistan Football Federation.

It was founded in 1992, with 8 clubs participating. The first champion of the league was CSKA Pomir Dushanbe. Currently the most successful team is FC Istiklol.

Clubs

Soviet era

1937: Dinamo Stalinabad
1938–47: not played
1948: Sbornaya Gissara
1949: Dinamo Stalinabad
1950: Dinamo Stalinabad
1951: Dinamo Stalinabad
1952: Profsoyuz Leninabad
1953: Dinamo Stalinabad
1954: Profsoyuz Leninabad
1955: Dinamo Stalinabad
1956: Metallurg Leninabad
1957: Taksobaza Stalinabad
1958: Dinamo Stalinabad
1959: Kuroma Taboshary
1960: Pogranichnik Dushanbe
1961: Vakhsh Kurgan-Tyube
1962: Pogranichnik Dushanbe
1963: DSA Dushanbe
1964: Zvezda Dushanbe
1965: Zvezda Dushanbe
1966: Volga Dushanbe
1967: Irrigator Dushanbe
1968: Irrigator Dushanbe
1969: Irrigator Dushanbe
1970: Pedagogichesky Institut Dushanbe
1971: TIFK Dushanbe
1972: Neftyanik Leninsky Rayon
1973: Politekhnichesky Institut Dushanbe
1974: SKIF Dushanbe
1975: SKIF Dushanbe
1976: SKIF Dushanbe
1977: Metallurg Regar Tursunzoda
1978: Pakhtakor Kurgan-Tyube
1979: Trudovye Rezervy Dushanbe
1980: Chashma Shaartuz
1981: Trikotazhnik Ura-Tyube
1982: Trikotazhnik Ura-Tyube
1983: Trikotazhnik Ura-Tyube
1984: Trikotazhnik Ura-Tyube
1985: Vakhsh Kurgan-Tyube
1986: SKIF Dushanbe
1987: SKIF Dushanbe
1988: SKIF Dushanbe
1989: Metallurg Regar Tursunzoda
1990: Avtomobilist Kurgan-Tyube
1991: Sokhibkor Dushanbe

Since independence

Wins by club

Clubs by spell

2023 season

Ten clubs compete in the 2023 Tajikistan Higher League, with two promoted from Tajikistan First League:

Sponsorship

Foreign players
List of foreign football players in Tajikistan

References

External links
Official Website
League at FIFA

 
Football competitions in Tajikistan
Tajikistan
Sports leagues established in 1992
1992 establishments in Tajikistan
0